Diamond East Midlands, formerly Midland Classic, is a bus company from Burton upon Trent, Staffordshire, England. Since August 2022, the company is a subsidiary of Rotala.

History

Midland Classic

Midland Classic was founded in July 2005 by James Boddice with a pair of London Central AEC Routemasters operating charter services. Boddice had a 69% shareholding with D&G Bus proprietor having David Reeves and Julian Peddle each having 13% and John Mitchelson 5%. It later diversified into operating route services. 

In April 2016, Midland Classic entered talks with Arriva Midlands to purchase its Stanton Road, Burton upon Trent garage and fleet. The deal took effect on 27 August 2016 with 30 buses and 80 staff transferring. All routes later transferred to the Wetmore Road garage, with the Stanton Road garage closing.

During the 2021 Go North West strike, Midland Classic was one of a number of bus operators who provided vehicles and drivers to operate services on behalf of Go North West along with Edwards Coaches and Selwyns Travel.

In June 2022, Midland Classic underwent a fares revision which included a joint day-ticket with Select Bus Services and Chaserider. On 1 August 2022, Midland Classic took over routes 125 and 129, expanding its reach of services out to Leicester, Coalville and Loughborough.

Diamond East Midlands
Rotala Group acquired Midland Classic on 3 August 2022, for £2 million. The business is to be rebranded Diamond East Midlands, with buses from other Diamond operations being transferred into the fleet and a repaint programme for pre-existing Midland Classic vehicles soon to begin, and will be directly controlled from the group's headquarters in Tividale by 30 November 2022.

Services
Diamond East Midlands are the main provider of services around Burton upon Trent with services extending to Swadlincote, Ashby-de-la-Zouch, Uttoxeter, Lichfield, Melbourne, East Midlands Airport, Derby, and other surrounding towns and villages.

Services are also operated on behalf of Leicestershire County Council between Ashby and Loughborough (129) and  Leicester and Castle Donington via Coalville (125)

References

External links

Burton upon Trent
Bus operators in Staffordshire
Transport companies established in 2005
2005 establishments in England